Samuel Charles Blackwell (1823–1901) was an Anglo-American abolitionist.

Biography
Blackwell was born in England, the son of Bristol sugar refiner Samuel Blackwell (c. 1790–August 7, 1838) and Hannah Lane, who moved their family of eight children to the United States in 1832. They first lived in New York City, and later in New Jersey. Samuel Blackwell senior, an anti-slavery campaigner and Congregationalist who wanted his daughters educated as well as his sons, passed his interest in social reform on to his children. In 1838, the year he died, the family was living in Cincinnati, Ohio.

He was the husband of Antoinette Brown, the first woman ordained in a recognized church in the United States, and prominent speaker in the Abolitionism and Women's Rights Movements.  Blackwell was also an abolitionist and was, like his wife, a Unitarian. He married Brown at her home in Henrietta, New York in 1856.  At that time, Blackwell was in the hardware business and also invested in real estate. The couple next lived in New York City and then for many years in New Jersey. Blackwell helped care for their children (seven, of whom two died young), each of them given the "double" name Brown Blackwell.

His brother, Henry B. Blackwell, was the husband of Lucy Stone, a friend of Antoinette Brown at Oberlin College.  Stone was also an important abolitionist and worker for women's suffrage.

He was the brother of Elizabeth Blackwell, the first women to receive an MD in United States and the first to practice medicine, and Emily Blackwell, the third female graduate of a U.S. medical school.

He was also the brother of two writers: the biographer Sarah Ellen Blackwell and Anna Blackwell, who translated George Sand and Alan Kardec.

References

Encyclopedia of New Jersey ed. Marc Mappen, Maxine N Lurie
JoAnn Macdonald, Antoinette Brown Blackwell
Oxford Dictionary of National Biography (article on Elizabeth Blackwell)

Blackwell, Samuel C.
Blackwell, Samuel C.
Blackwell, Samuel C.
Blackwell family
American abolitionists